Acholi (also Leb Acoli, or Leb Lwo) is a Southern Luo dialect spoken by the Acholi people in the districts of Gulu, Kitgum , Amuru , Lamwo , Agago , Nwoya ,  Omoroand Pader (a region known as Acholiland) in northern Uganda. It is also spoken in South Sudan in Magwi County, Eastern Equatoria.

Song of Lawino, well known in African literature, was written in Acholi by Okot p'Bitek, although its sequel, Song of Ocol, was written in English.

Acholi, Alur, and Jo Padola have between 84 and 90 per cent of their vocabulary in common and are mutually intelligible. However, they are often counted as separate languages because their speakers are ethnically distinct. Labwor (Thur), once considered a dialect of Acholi, may not be intelligible with it.

Phonology
Acholi has vowel harmony: all vowels in a word have to belong to a single class (e.g.  the cold vs.  to separate). There are two sets of five vowels, distinguished by the feature [+/-ATR].

/pʷ/ and /bʷ/ sounds may also sound as labial affricates [pf] and [bv].

Acholi is a tonal language. Thus, some words may be distinguished by tone alone, e.g. bèl (low) 'wrinkled' vs. bél (high) 'corn' and kàl (low) 'place enclosed by a palisade' vs. kál (high) 'millet'. Tone furthermore plays a role in verb conjugation.

Recent work 

The above were the old work of the missionaries Alfred Malandra and Crazzolara published in 1955.  However, a more up-to-date Acholi orthography by Janet Lakareber shows that a vowel in Acholi language has more than two pronunciations. A monosyllabic word in Acholi has 14 different pronunciations. This is explained in the nine books of Acoli Accented Orthography.

Notes and references

Notes
  Heron, G.A., 1972, Introduction p. 8 in p'Bitek, Okot, 1984.
  Ladefoged et al., 1972:80.

Endnotes

Bibliography
Crazzolara, J.P. (1938) A study of the Acooli language. Grammar and Vocabulary. International Institute of African Languages and Cultures. London/New York/Toronto: Oxford University Press.
Kitching, Arthur Leonard (1932) An outline grammar of the Acholi language (first published 1907). London: Sheldon Press / Kampala: The Uganda Bookshop.
Ladefoged, Peter; Ruth Glick; Clive Criper; Clifford H. Prator; Livingstone Walusimbi (1972) Language in Uganda (Ford Foundation language surveys vol. 1). London/New York etc. Oxford University Press. 
Malandra, Alfred (1955) A new Acholi grammar. Kampala: Eagle Press. Hathitrust record
Okidi, Festo (2000) Acholi for beginners: grammar, Acholi–English, English–Acholi. London: Pilato Books. 
p'Bitek, Okot (1985) Acholi proverbs. Nairobi: Heinemann Kenya.
p'Bitek, Okot (1984) Song of Lawino and Song of Ocol. (African Writers Series, 266). London: Heinemann Educational.
Janet Lakareber (2011) Coono Leb Acoli (intro) Acoli Accented Orthography. London: GBILA.

External links

Listen to a sample of Acholi from Global Recordings Network
IRIN Radio – Radio programming from northern Uganda in Luo

Acholi
Languages of Uganda
Languages of South Sudan
Luo languages